"My Song Is Love Unknown" is a hymn by Samuel Crossman, written in 1664. It is predominantly used as a hymn for Good Friday.

The hymn tune to which it is usually sung is called Love Unknown by John Ireland (1879–1962). Ireland composed the melody over lunch one day at the suggestion of organist and fellow-composer Geoffrey Shaw.

History 
Samuel Crossman was a Puritan minister who had taken part in the Savoy Conference but was ejected from the Church of England due to his opposition to the Act of Uniformity 1662. During his exile from the Church of England, he wrote "My Song Is Love Unknown" as a poem in 1664. It was first published in The Young Man’s Meditation and then became published as an Anglican hymn in 1684, after Crossman had rejoined the Church of England in 1665 and two years after his death. The last verse of the hymn was written as an imitation of George Herbert's The Temple poem as a tribute by Crossman to Herbert. In the 21st century, the language of the hymn is sometimes updated by hymnal editors, a move which is often lamented by traditional hymnologists who feel that the newer language loses the original meaning and nuance.

The most commonly used tune for "My Song Is Love Unknown" is called "Love Unknown". It was written by John Ireland in 1925 and reportedly was composed in 15 minutes on the back of a menu. Ireland's tune was credited with bringing the hymn out of obscurity which it had fallen into during Victorian times.

Analysis
The Reverend Percy Dearmer stated that "My Song Is Love Unknown" "... illustrates the fact that 17th-century Britain was free from the unwholesome treatment of the Passion which is shown, for instance, in the Spanish sculpture of that age". The fourth verse asked what Jesus had done to deserve the crucifixion with the ironic answer being that he had healed the sick.

Lyrics

Inspirations
The British band Coldplay's song "A Message" on their 2005 album X&Y, is lyrically and musically derived from the hymn.

References

External links
 My Song Is Love Unknown

English Christian hymns
1664 works
Compositions by John Ireland
Songs about Jesus
17th-century hymns